Celimpilo "Mpilo" Gumede (born 8 July 2000) is a South African rugby union player for the  in Super Rugby. His regular position is flanker.

Gumede was named in the Sharks squad for both the 2020 Super Rugby season and the subsequent Super Rugby Unlocked competition.

References

External links
Mpilo Gumede at Olympedia

South African rugby union players
Living people
2000 births
Rugby union flankers
Sharks (rugby union) players
Sharks (Currie Cup) players
Cheetahs (rugby union) players